.wtf is a generic top-level domain (gTLD) run by Donuts, a gTLD registry. It is derived from "WTF", an online acronym for "what the fuck?".

In June 2012, Ryan Singel of Wired predicted no one would ever set up the .wtf domain, but later that month an application for the domain was submitted to ICANN, and although in August 2012 the Saudi Arabian government objected to .wtf and 30 other newly proposed top-level domains such as .gay, .bible and .islam, ICANN approved .wtf on 23 April 2014. Google indexed about 4,350,000 webpages with the .wtf domain.

References

External links 
 Whois information for .wtf (IANA)
 Source from ICANNWIKI

Generic top-level domains